is a 1987 action-adventure game that was released exclusively in Japan for the Nintendo Famicom.

Initially, there were plans to bring the game to the English market under the title Bashi Bazook: Morphoid Masher. Initial plans to bring this version to the English market fell through due to the game's similarity to Xexyz. However, English-translated ROMs of the game later became widely circulated on the Internet.

Story
In the year 2081, Earth is taken over by a group of hostile monsters under the command of a mysterious entity known as the "Increaser". A warrior named Dan travels in his time machine from the year 2081 to the year 1999 in order to stop the invasion before it could spell devastation for the humans.

Gameplay

Emphasis is placed on exploration in the gameplay. Enemies must be defeated to earn energy points that can be spent on power-ups to improve the player's character. While starting out with a basic sword, other weapons can either be found or bought. There is no linear order on how a stage progresses. There are five different levels, each with deadly traps and surprises. Boss battles are fought at the end of levels.

As the game progresses, bosses and normal enemies become more difficult to defeat. The bosses also become larger as the levels progress. Players must also face a strict time limit that determines how powerful bosses are at the end of the level. Going through the levels quickly will allow the player to confront weaker states of bosses, while taking longer amounts of time will force the player to confront more powerful states of bosses.

In the Japanese version of the game, all shopkeepers use the Kansai dialect of Japanese.

See also
List of games containing time travel

Notes

References

External links
Bio Senshi Dan: Increaser to no Tatakai at Giant Bomb
Bio Senshi Dan: Increaser to no Tatakai  at Project EGG

1987 video games
Atlus games
Jaleco games
Japan-exclusive video games
Nintendo Entertainment System games
Nintendo Entertainment System-only games
Platform games
Science fiction video games
Video games about time travel
Video games set in 1999
Video games developed in Japan
Video games scored by Tsukasa Masuko
Single-player video games